The Vadnals were American polka style music group.

The Vadnals were assembled by the brothers with the surname Vadnal, they were Slovene immigrants in United States.
Vadnals were mostly recognised by playing Slovenian style polka, which was popular in Cleveland and across the United States. The group was touring around the world during the 1970s and 1980s and was also popular in the homeland among the Slovenes in Slovenia. They also played a couple of times on Slovenian immigrant meetings in Slovenia. Their most famous songs were : Ta glažek je prazen, No Beer Today, Oj, volodje morja

Members
 Richie Vadnal
 Johnny Vadnal
 Tony Vadnal
 Frank Vadnal
 Frank Mahnic
 Bill Snick
 Joe Stradiot

Discography 
 RICHIE VADNAL’S ORCHESTRA - V IS FOR VADNAL - Cuca Records K-2069
 RICHIE VADNAL’S ORCHESTRA - HERE’S CHEERS - Delta Records DI-7009
 RICHIE VADNAL’S ORCHESTRA - POLKA-RE POLKA-RA - Delta Records DI-7011
 RICHIE VADNAL’S ORCHESTRA - VADNALS IN EUROPE - Delta Records DI-7018 
 ANSAMBEL RICHIE VADNAL - TA GLAZEK JE PRAZEN - Helidon Records SLP 04-18
 ANSAMBEL RICHIE VADNAL - V SOBOTO ZVECER - Helidon Records FLP-04-025
 ANSAMBEL RICHIEJA VADNALA - STARA LJUBEZEN - Helidon Records FLP-04-033
 ANSAMBEL RICHIEJA VADNALA - POZDRAV DOMACEMU KRAJU - Helidon Records FLP-04-037
 THE VADNALS - INSTRUMENTALLY - AND RAY GAY'S MUSIC - Normandy Records D1-7161
 RICHIE VADNAL’S ORCHESTRA - GREEN VALLEY - CBV Records 108008
 RICHIE VADNAL’S ORCHESTRA - GREEN VALLEY - CBV Records 108008
 RICHIE VADNAL’S ORCHESTRA - POLKA YOUR TROUBLES AWAY - One M Records1007
 (2004) RICHIE VADNAL’S ORCHESTRA - POLKA-RE POLKA-RA - Normandy Records NCD-7166
 (2010) RICHIE VADNAL - THE VADNAL BROTHERS - FULL CIRCLE - Kravos Recordings 2010

See also 
 Slovenian-style polka
 Frankie Yankovich

References

External links 
 Page about Richie Vadnal

American people of Slovenian descent
Musicians from Ohio
Polka musicians
Slovene-American culture in Ohio